The Venetian Crusade of 1122–1124 was an expedition to the Holy Land launched by the Republic of Venice that succeeded in capturing Tyre.
It was an important victory at the start of a period when the Kingdom of Jerusalem would expand to its greatest extent under Baldwin II of Jerusalem. 
The Venetians gained valuable trading concessions in Tyre. Through raids on Byzantine territory both on the way to the Holy Land and on the return journey, the Venetians forced the Byzantines to confirm, as well as extend, their trading privileges with the empire.

Preparation

Baldwin of Bourcq was a nephew of Baldwin I of Jerusalem and the Count of Edessa from 1100 to 1118. 
In 1118 his uncle died and he became Baldwin II of Jerusalem.
In the Battle of Ager Sanguinis, fought near Sarmada on 28 June 1119, the Franks suffered a disastrous defeat by the forces of Ilghazi, the ruler of Mardin. 
Later that year Baldwin regained some territory, but the Franks were seriously weakened.
Baldwin asked for help from Pope Callixtus II. The pope forwarded the request to Venice.

The terms of the crusade were agreed through negotiations between the envoys of Baldwin II and the doge of Venice. 
Once the Venetians decided to participate, Callixtus sent them his papal banner to signify his approval,
At the First Council of the Lateran he confirmed that the Venetions had crusader privileges, including remission of their sins.
The church also extended its protection to the families and property of the crusaders.

In 1122 the Doge of Venice, Domenico Michiel, launched the seaborne crusade.
The Venetian fleet of more than 120 ships carrying over 15,000 men left the Venetian Lagoon on 8 August 1122.
This seems to have been the first crusade in which the knights brought their horses with them.
They invested Corfu, then a possession of the Byzantine Empire, with which Venice had a dispute over privileges.
In 1123 Baldwin II was captured by Belek Ghazi, emir of Aleppo, and imprisoned in Kharput. 
Eustace Graverius became regent of Jerusalem.
The Venetians abandoned the siege of Corfu when they heard this news, and reached the Palestinian coast in May 1123.

Battle of Jaffa

The Venetian fleet arrived at Acre at the end of May and was informed about a Fatimid fleet, of around a hundred sail, sailing towards Ascalon in order to assist the Belek Ghazi at his siege. Thus the Venetian fleet sailed south in order to meet it and Doge Michele ordered the division of the fleet into two parts with the weaker force at the helm and the stronger one hiding behind it. With the intent to divert the fleet off Ascalon. The Egyptians fell into the trap assuming an easy victory they were now caught between two Venetian squadrons and outnumbered. Some 4,000 Muslims were killed, including the Fatimid admiral, and 9 vessels captured, with the Venetians adding to their triumph the capture of 10 merchant vessels en route back to Acre. Both Fulcher of Chartres (Book III/20) and William of Tyre (Book XII/22-23) recorded the event.

Siege of Tyre

On 15 February 1124, the Venetians and the Franks began the siege of Tyre. The seaport of Tyre, now in Lebanon, was part of the territory of Toghtekin, the atabeg of Damascus. The Latin army was led by the Patriarch of Antioch, the doge of Venice, Pons, Count of Tripoli and William de Bury, the king's constable.

The Venetians and Franks built siege towers and machines that could throw boulders to shatter the city walls. 
The defenders of Tyre also built engines, hurling rocks at the siege towers. 
As the siege dragged on, the citizens began to run short of food and sent urgent calls for help.
Balak died while besieging the city of Manbij.
Toghtekin advanced towards Tyre, but withdrew without fighting when the forces of Count Pons of Tripoli and Constable William rode to confront him.
Toghtekin sent envoys in June 1124 to negotiate peace. After lengthy and difficult discussions it was agreed that the terms of surrender would include letting those who wanted to leave the city to take their families and property with them, while those who wanted to stay would keep their houses and possessions. This was unpopular with some of the crusaders, who wanted to loot the city.

Tyre surrendered on 29 June 1124. After the crusader forces entered the city, according to William of Tyre, "They admired the fortifications of the city, the strength of the buildings, the massive walls and lofty towers, the noble harbour so difficult of access. They had only praise for the resolute perseverance of the citizens who, despite the pressure of terrible hunger and the scarcity of supplies, had been able to ward off surrender for so long. For when our forces took possession of the place they found only five measures of wheat in the city."

Aftermath

Baldwin II was in captivity during the conquest of Tyre, but was released later that year.
He immediately broke the terms of his release.
Baldwin II granted the Venetians extensive commercial privileges in Tyre, and thus ensured that they would maintain a naval presence in the Latin East.
The privilege included guarantees of property rights for the heirs of Venetians who were shipwrecked or who died in Tyre.

Many of the people who left Tyre moved to Damascus.
Baldwin II resumed hostilities against Aleppo and Damascus, and obtained tribute from both states.
Under Baldwin II the kingdom of Jerusalem grew to its greatest extent.
Tyre prospered as part of the kingdom of Jerusalem. When the Holy Roman Emperor Frederick I Barbarossa died during the Third Crusade he was buried in the Tyre Cathedral. The town was captured and destroyed by the Mamluks in 1291.

The Venetian fleet passed through the Aegean Sea on the return voyage. The Venetians again pillaged Greek islands.
The Greeks were forced to abandon the dispute and confirm the commercial privileges of Venice.

References

Citations

Sources

1120s conflicts
Wars involving the Kingdom of Jerusalem
12th century in the Republic of Venice
1122 in Asia
Wars involving the Republic of Venice
1120s in the Crusader states
Wars involving the Fatimid Caliphate